The 1993 Japan rugby union tour of Argentina was a series of matches played in May 1993 in Argentina by Japan national rugby union team.

Results 
Scores and results list South Japan's points tally first.

References
 
 Memorias de la UAR 1994

Japan rugby union tour
Japan national rugby union team tours
Rugby union tours of Argentina
Tour